Blues in the Night is a 1941 American musical in the film noir style directed by Anatole Litvak and starring Priscilla Lane, Richard Whorf, Betty Field, Lloyd Nolan, Elia Kazan, and Jack Carson. It was released by Warner Brothers. The project began filming with the working title Hot Nocturne, the play upon which it is based, but was eventually named after its principal musical number "Blues in the Night", which became a popular hit.  The film was nominated for a Best Song Oscar for "Blues in the Night" (Music by Harold Arlen; lyrics by Johnny Mercer).

Plot
While playing in a bar in St. Louis, jazz pianist Jigger Pine meets aspiring clarinetist Nickie Haroyen, who tries to convince him to put together a jazz band. After a drunk patron starts a fight, Nickie and Jigger, along with Jigger's  drummer and bassist, are thrown in jail. They overhear a prisoner singing a blues song and are inspired to set out for New Orleans, where they hope to learn how to perfect an authentic bluesy sound. There they meet fast-talking trumpeter Leo and his wife, Character, who is a talented singer. Together, the quintet rides the rails, honing their technique in dive bars across the country.

One day, while sheltering in a boxcar they meet a mysterious stranger named Del, who robs them. But when they don't turn him in to the authorities, Del is so impressed by their camaraderie, he offers them a job in a New Jersey roadhouse called The Jungle. The group discovers that the roadhouse is actually owned by Del's former partners in crime - aspiring singer Kay, accomplice Sam, and her disabled sidekick Brad. Del has escaped from jail to retrieve his share of a robbery the three committed; when Kay tells him they have spent all the money, he decides to take over The Jungle and transform it into an illegal gambling club. Kay tries to rekindle her past romance with Del, but he rejects her. She turns her attention to Leo in hopes of making Del jealous.

Although the band is happy playing their brand of jazz each night at the club, Character is worried about Leo and Kay. When Jigger reveals to him that Character is pregnant, Leo decides to give up Kay. She subsequently sets her sights on Jigger, who is secretly in love with her and insists the band take her on as singer while Character is taking time off. Jigger reacts to Brad's warning that the musician should get her out of his system by saying, "I just don't think I can". Sam tries to get Kay to alert the police to Del's whereabouts. She tells Del about this, hoping that the fact that she refused to do it will win her Del's affection; instead, he orders Sam to be killed and Kay to leave The Jungle. She convinces Jigger to quit the band, go with her to New York City, and join a more commercial, mainstream jazz band.

Although successful, Jigger is unhappy in his new life, feeling he is not playing authentic jazz. Kay lives on her own terms in New York, she goes out with different men and is not interested in Jigger's career with the band. One night, he tells her he has quit and wants to go back to his friends. He wants her to go with him but she tells him the only thing she would ever want from The Jungle is Del, that she has never been in love with Jigger.

After Kay leaves him, Jigger descends into alcoholism. His friends find him and try to coax him into playing with them again. He tells them he is busy composing and has many big plans but, as he tries to demonstrate some of his music, he collapses with a mental breakdown. Everybody sticks by him, helping to nurse him back to health, though they are hiding the fact that Character's baby has died. They all return to The Jungle where Jigger plays again and rediscovers happiness.

One night, during a rainstorm, both Jigger and Del notice Kay's return. Jigger speaks with her first. When Del comes in, Kay confronts him and demands he allow her to stay; he refuses so she threatens to turn him in herself. Del pulls a gun and Jigger comes to her defense. During the ensuing fight, Del drops the gun; Kay picks it up, shoots and kills him. Jigger decides to protect Kay and help her escape from the police; he tells her to go wait for him in Del's car. The band shows up; as they angrily assail Jigger with reasons to not leave with Kay, they reveal that Character lost the baby. They compare Jigger, his emotional and mental problems, with Brad being disabled. They try to emphasize that, while Brad has no choice about his pathetic circumstances, Jigger certainly does. Brad overhears all this and joins Kay in the car, claiming that Jigger has asked him to drive her away. He takes off into the violent storm, talking about the two of them being together, and deliberately wrecks the car, killing them both.

Jigger and the band return to their life on the road, happy to be again playing their preferred version of jazz.

Cast
 Richard Whorf as Jigger Pine, a talented jazz pianist
 Priscilla Lane as Ginger "Character" Powell, the band's singer
 Lloyd Nolan as Del Davis, a gangster and racketeer
 Betty Field as Kay Grant, Del's scheming former girlfriend
 Jack Carson as Leo Powell, Character's loud-mouthed, conceited husband who plays trumpet for the band
 Elia Kazan as Nickie Haroyen, the band's clarinetist who gave up law school for music 
 Wallace Ford as Brad Ames, a disabled former guitar player who is hopelessly in love with Kay 
 Howard Da Silva as Sam Paryas, an opportunistic member of Del's gang    
 Peter Whitney as Pete Bossett, the band's bassist
 Billy Halop as Peppi, the band's young drummer
 George Lloyd as Joe, the St. Louis cafe owner
 Charles C. Wilson as Barney
 William Gillespie as baritone singer in jail cell
 Matt McHugh as the Drunk
 Ernest Whitman as Black Prisoner #1 
 Napoleon Simpson as Black Prisoner #2
 Dudley Dickerson as Black Prisoner #3 
 Anthony Warde as Del's Henchman #1 
 Sol Gorss as Del's Henchman #2
 Mabel Todd as performer

Production
The film began when Elia Kazan optioned an unproduced play by Edwin Gilbert called Hot Nocturne and began retooling it for Broadway. He eventually sold the rights to Warner Bros. who gave the script to Robert Rossen to complete. After initially retitling it New Orleans Blues, the studio named it after its principal musical number "Blues in the Night", which later became a popular hit. Kazan agreed to give up his screenwriting credit and appeared as a clarinetist in the film. He later remarked that after acting in the film he became convinced he could "direct better than Anatole Litzvak". James Cagney and Dennis Morgan were the studio's first two choices to play the gangster Del Davis, but the role was eventually given to Lloyd Nolan. John Garfield was cast in the role of pianist Jigger Pine who was eventually played by Richard Whorf.

Music
The film's music is by Harold Arlen with lyrics by Johnny Mercer. Additional music was written by Heinz Roemheld and Ray Heindorf (only Roemheld was credited). The film features the bands of Jimmie Lunceford and Will Osborne. With the exception of Priscilla Lane none of the actors were musicians so their playing had to be dubbed by other artists. The trumpet music performed by Jack Carson's character was dubbed by Snooky Young and Frankie Zinzer while the piano music was dubbed by Stan Wrightsman. Saxophonist and clarinetist Archie Rosate played Elia Kazan's clarinet solos.

 "Blues in the Night" (William Gillespie)
 "This Time the Dream's On Me" (Priscilla Lane) 
 "Hang on to Your Lids, Kids" (Priscilla Lane)
 "Says Who, Says You, Says I" (Mabel Todd)
 "Wait Till It Happens to You" (Betty Field) (dubbed by Trudy Erwin)

Reception
Blues in the Night was met with a mixed critical reception upon its release. Hollywood columnist Fred Othman named it "the worst musical of the year". Donald Kirkley of The Baltimore Sun called it "a bizarre...screen oddity" while Los Angeles Times film critic Philip K. Scheuer praised Richard Whorf's performance. It was not financially successful as its East Coast release took place shortly before the attack on Pearl Harbor.

The film has since achieved a small cult following, including The Simpsons creator Matt Groening.

The film is recognized by American Film Institute in these lists:
 2004: AFI's 100 Years...100 Songs:	
 "Blues in the Night" – Nominated

References

External links
 
 
 
 
 

1941 films
1941 musical films
American crime films
American black-and-white films
1940s English-language films
Film noir
Films about music and musicians
American films based on plays
Films directed by Anatole Litvak
Warner Bros. films
Films scored by Heinz Roemheld
Films with screenplays by Robert Rossen
1941 crime films
American musical films
1940s American films